Nuttall is an English surname, possibly derived from the small village of that name in Bury parish, Lancashire, and first found in the 13th century. It has been and remains a very common name in parts of Lancashire from the 16th century onward.

People with the surname

 Alex Nuttall (born 1985), Canadian politician
 Amy Nuttall (born 1982), British actress
 Anthony Nuttall (1937–2007), English literary critic
 Anthony Nuttall (rugby league) (born 1968), Irish rugby league footballer
 Bill Nuttall (born 1948), American soccer player and businessman
 Billy Nuttall (born 1920), English footballer
 Carrie Nuttall (born 1963), photographer
 Charles Nuttall (1872–1934), Australian artist
 David Nuttall (born 1962), British politician
 Edmund Nuttall (priest) (died 1616), Canon of Windsor
 Sir Edmund Nuttall, 1st Baronet (1870–1923), British civil engineer
 Edward Nuttall (born 1993), New Zealand cricketer
 Enos Nuttall (1842–1916), clergyman
 Alex Nuttall (born 1985), Canadian politician
 George Nuttall (1863–1937), British-American bacteriologist
 Gordon Nuttall (born 1953), Australian politician
 Harry Nuttall (politician) (1849–1924), British politician
 Harry Nuttall (footballer) (1897–1969), English footballer
 Harry Nuttall (racing driver) (born 1963), British auto racing driver
 Henry Nuttall (1855–1945), English cricketer
 Jack Nuttall (1929–1992), Australian rules footballer
 James Nuttall (1840–1907), professional British runner
 James W. Nuttall (born 1953), United States Army major general
 Jeff Nuttall (1933–2004), British poet
 John Mitchell Nuttall (1890–1958), English physicist
 Joseph Nuttall (1869–1942), English swimmer
 L. John Nuttall (1834–1905), English Latter-Day Saint
 L. John Nuttall (educator) (1887–1944), acting president of Brigham Young University
 Kate Henshaw-Nuttall (born 1971), Nigerian actress
 Katharina Nuttall (born 1972), Norwegian artist, composer, and music producer
 Keir Nuttall (born 1975), musician
 Michael Nuttall (born 1934), South African Anglican bishop
 Mike Nuttall, British-American designer
 Nicholas Nuttall (1933–2007), 3rd Baronet, heir to construction fortune
 Nick Nuttall (born 1958), spokesperson/Head of Media, UN Environment Programme 
 Pat Nuttall (born 1953), British virologist and acarologist
 Paul Nuttall (born 1976), British politician
 P. Austin Nuttall (1790s–1869), British dictionary publisher
 Robert Nuttall (1908–1983), English footballer
 Sonja Nuttall, British fashion designer
 Thomas Nuttall (1786–1859), English botanist and zoologist
 Tom Nuttall (1889–1963), English footballer
 Wilmer John Nuttall (1920–2003), Canadian politician
 Zelia Nuttall (1857–1933), US archaeologist

Fictional character
Thomas “Tom” Nuttall, a saloon owner in the TV series Deadwood, portrayed by Leon Rippy

See also 
 Nuttall (disambiguation)
 John Nuttall (disambiguation)

References 

English-language surnames
English toponymic surnames